The Sea Sprite 23 is an American trailerable sailboat that was designed by Carl Alberg as a daysailer and cruiser and first built in 1958.

The design was built in two versions, the Daysailor and the Weekender.

It was also called the Alberg 23 in 1970 when produced by C. E. Ryder.

Production
The design was built by American Boatbuilding, Wickford Shipyard, C. E. Ryder, the Sailstar Boat Company and the Beetle Boat Company in the United States, but it is now out of production.

Design
The Sea Sprite 23 is a recreational keelboat, built predominantly of fiberglass, with wood trim. It has a fractional sloop rig; a spooned, raked stem; a raised counter, angled, transom; a keel-mounted rudder controlled by a tiller and a fixed long keel. It displaces  and carries  of ballast.

The different builders incorporated different features in the design. Ryder's boats had an outboard motor well under a lazarette hatch cover, while Sailstar's used an open well. Ryder also used encapsulated lead ballast, while earlier builders used external, bolt-on lead ballast.

Variants
Sea Sprite 23 Daysailor
This model has a smaller cabin with two settee berths, but a longer cockpit. The cockpit has wooden seats and is not self-bailing, but the boat is equipped with a mainsheet traveler and a cabin-top stepped mast, with one set of lower shrouds.
Sea Sprite 23 Weekender
This model has a self-bailing cockpit, with molded fiberglass seats. It is not equipped with a mainsheet traveler. The mast is deck-stepped, forward of the coach house and there are two sets of lower shrouds. It a cabin with a companionway and steps. The cabin has sleeping accommodation for four people, with a double "V"-berth in the bow and two straight settee berths aft. The galley is located on both sides, just aft of the bow "V"-berth and is equipped with an ice box to port and a sink to starboard. This version was first built by Beetle Boats.

Operational history
The boat is supported by an active class club that organizes racing events, the Sea Sprite Association.

In a 2010 review Steve Henkel wrote, "worst features: The somewhat shallow draft of three feet detracts a bit from upwind performance, although reaching and running is unaffected."

See also
List of sailing boat types

References

External links
Photo of a Sea Sprite 23s racing

Keelboats
1950s sailboat type designs
Sailing yachts
Trailer sailers
Sailboat type designs by Carl Alberg
Sailboat types built by American Boatbuilding
Sailboat types built by Wickford Shipyard
Sailboat types built by C. E. Ryder
Sailboat types built by Sailstar Boat Company
Sailboat types built by Beetle Boat Company